Murray City is a village in Hocking County, Ohio, United States. The population was 449 at the 2010 census.

History
Murray City was platted in 1873 and incorporated in 1891. It was named for John Murray Brown, the original owner of the town site. John Murray Brown was an early settler who bought up the land to lay out the town.  He built a hotel in 1875 for the local workers but sold his interests in the community a few years later to a large coal company.  

Murray City was once one of the largest coal towns in the country with over 2,000 residents.  It had a semi-pro football team in the 1920s, the Murray City Tigers, which is now in the Pro Football Hall of Fame.

Geography
Murray City is located at  (39.510569, -82.165762), along the Snow Fork, a tributary of Monday Creek.

Demographics

2010 census
As of the census of 2010, there were 449 people, 175 households, and 117 families living in the village. The racial makeup of the village was 99.1% White, 0.2% African American, and 0.7% from two or more races. Hispanic or Latino of any race were 1.3% of the population.

There were 175 households, of which 33.7% had children under the age of 18 living with them, 46.3% were married couples living together, 13.1% had a female householder with no husband present, 7.4% had a male householder with no wife present, and 33.1% were non-families. 24.0% of all households were made up of individuals, and 10.8% had someone living alone who was 65 years of age or older. The average household size was 2.57 and the average family size was 2.97.

The median age in the village was 37.4 years. 23.6% of residents were under the age of 18; 10% were between the ages of 18 and 24; 24.9% were from 25 to 44; 28.5% were from 45 to 64; and 12.9% were 65 years of age or older. The gender makeup of the village was 49.9% male and 50.1% female.

2000 census
As of the census of 2000, there were 452 people, 190 households, and 132 families living in the village. The population density was 1,509.4 people per square mile (581.7/km2). There were 211 housing units at an average density of 704.6 per square mile (271.6/km2). The racial makeup of the village was 97.57% White, 0.44% Native American, and 1.99% from two or more races.

There were 190 households, out of which 32.6% had children under the age of 18 living with them, 51.6% were married couples living together, 13.2% had a female householder with no husband present, and 30.5% were non-families. 25.3% of all households were made up of individuals, and 13.7% had someone living alone who was 65 years of age or older. The average household size was 2.38 and the average family size was 2.86.

In the village, the population was spread out, with 24.3% under the age of 18, 9.7% from 18 to 24, 29.0% from 25 to 44, 23.9% from 45 to 64, and 13.1% who were 65 years of age or older. The median age was 35 years. For every 100 females, there were 97.4 males. For every 100 females age 18 and over, there were 94.3 males.

The median income for a household in the village was $27,969, and the median income for a family was $32,188. Males had a median income of $30,333 versus $20,313 for females. The per capita income for the village was $12,730. About 19.5% of families and 19.8% of the population were below the poverty line, including 24.3% of those under age 18 and 12.3% of those age 65 or over.

Public services
The residents of Murray City are served by the Nelsonville-York City School District and Nelsonville-York High School.

Notable people
Clifford Carlson, basketball coach
Josh Devore, baseball player

References

External links
 Community history

Villages in Ohio
Villages in Hocking County, Ohio